Liard Island is a mountainous island,  long,  wide and rising to , situated in the north-central portion of Hanusse Bay, off the west coast of Graham Land, Antarctica. It was discovered and named by the French Antarctic Expedition, 1908–10, under Jean-Baptiste Charcot.

See also 
 Composite Antarctic Gazetteer
 Glen Peak
 List of Antarctic islands south of 60° S
 Mount Bridgman
 Scientific Committee on Antarctic Research
 Territorial claims in Antarctica

References

Islands of Graham Land
Loubet Coast